Julien Chouinard,  (February 4, 1929 – February 6, 1987) was a Canadian lawyer, civil servant and Puisne Justice of the Supreme Court of Canada.

Born in Quebec City, the son of Joseph Julien Chouinard and Berthe Cloutier, he received a BA in 1948 and a LL.L. in 1951 from Université Laval. As a Rhodes Scholar, he received a BA in 1953 from Oxford University. In 1953, he was called to the Quebec Bar and started to practice law. He also taught law at Université Laval.
Auxiliary professor at Laval University from 1959 and, mid-time professor from 1964.
Member of the lawyer cabinet Gagné, Prévost, Flynn.

In 1965, he joined the Quebec civil service as deputy minister of Justice. In 1968, he was appointed Secretary General of the Executive Council of Quebec. He ran unsuccessfully as the Progressive Conservative candidate for the House of Commons of Canada for the Quebec riding of Matane in the 1968 federal election. In recognition of his contribution to public service, he was made an Officer of the Order of Canada in 1974. In 1974, he was appointed to the Court of Appeal of Quebec. In 1979, Prime Minister Joe Clark appointed him to the Supreme Court, and he served until his death from brain cancer in 1987. He is buried in the Cimetière Notre-Dame-de-Belmont.

References

External links
Order of Canada Citation

1929 births
1987 deaths
Alumni of St John's College, Oxford
20th-century Canadian civil servants
Canadian Rhodes Scholars
Deaths from brain cancer in Canada
French Quebecers
Justices of the Supreme Court of Canada
Lawyers in Quebec
Officers of the Order of Canada
Politicians from Quebec City
Progressive Conservative Party of Canada candidates for the Canadian House of Commons
Candidates in the 1968 Canadian federal election
Academic staff of Université Laval
Université Laval alumni
20th-century Canadian lawyers
Université Laval Faculté de droit alumni